Michelle Currie (born February 9, 1980) is a Canadian former competitive figure skater. Currie is the 2001 Golden Spin of Zagreb champion and 2000 Canadian national silver medalist. She competed at the 2000 Four Continents Championships and six Grand Prix events. After her competitive retirement in 2004, she began coaching in Alberta.

Programs

Results
GP: Grand Prix

References

External links

 

1980 births
Living people
Canadian female single skaters
Figure skaters from Vancouver